Katherine Lyndsay Mavor,  (born 30 March 1962) is a British charity executive and businesswoman. Since May 2015, she has been chief executive officer (CEO) of English Heritage. Previously, she was  CEO of National Trust for Scotland from 2009 to 2015 and CEO of Project Scotland from 2005 to 2009.

Early life and education
Mavor was born on 30 March 1962 in London, England, and was brought up in Glasgow, Scotland. She was educated at Westbourne School for Girls. In 1980, she matriculated into Trinity College, Oxford to study modern languages; this was only the second year that the previously all-male college admitted female students. She graduated from the University of Oxford with a Bachelor of Arts (BA) degree in 1984; as per tradition, this was later promoted to a Master of Arts (MA (Oxon)) degree. She later completed a postgraduate diploma in marketing at the Polytechnic of Central London.

Career

Business career
Mavor's early career was spent in business and publishing. Having graduated from university, she spent a year as a graduate trainee at Thomson Books between 1984 and 1985. Then, she was a product manager at Macmillan Press from 1985 to 1986, and a publicity manager at Unwin Hyman from 1987 to 1988.

In 1988, Mavor moved into marketing, and was a marketing manager at Kogan Page for the next two years. From 1990 to 1994, she was Marketing Director for the Regent Schools of English. She was managing director of the Anglo-Polish Interchange between 1994 and 1997. The Anglo-Polish Interchange was set up by Mavor and is a market research company. In 1998, Mavor became Marketing Director of Language Line, a company offering telephone interpreting services. She was promoted to chief executive officer and led a venture-capital backed management buyout of the company.

Charity executive
From 2005 to 2009, she was CEO of Project Scotland, a Scottish volunteering organisation for young adults aged between 16 and 25. From 2009 to 2015, she was CEO of the National Trust for Scotland. On 3 February 2015, she was announced as the CEO of English Heritage. English Heritage became a charity in April 2015 having previously been a non-departmental public body of the British Government; when she officially became CEO in May 2015, she also became the first head of the new charity.

St Cross College
In 2023, Mavor was announced as the new master of St Cross College.

Personal life
In 1989, Mavor married Andrew Williams. Together, they have two sons.

Honours
In November 2014, Mavor was awarded a Doctor of the University (DUniv) degree by Heriot-Watt University "in recognition of her exceptional contribution to the promotion and preservation of Scotland's environmental heritage and to developments in the community volunteer movement". In 2015, she was made an honorary fellow of Trinity College, Oxford, her alma mater.

She was appointed Commander of the Order of the British Empire (CBE) in the 2022 New Year Honours for services to heritage.

References

1962 births
Living people
British women in business
British charity and campaign group workers
Businesspeople from London
People educated at Westbourne School for Girls
Alumni of Trinity College, Oxford
Alumni of the University of Westminster
Commanders of the Order of the British Empire